Cecilia Todd Vallenilla (born March 4, 1951 in Caracas, Venezuela) is a singer and cuatro player.

References

See also 
Venezuelan music

1951 births
Feminist musicians
Living people
Singers from Caracas
Venezuelan folk singers
20th-century Venezuelan women singers
Venezuelan feminists